Oskar Hoffmann (4 July 1877 – 3 February 1953) was a German editor and politician. He served in the Landtag in North Rhine-Westphalia and was a member of the Social Democratic Party of Germany. After the war, he became a member of the Communist Party. He was arrested in 1933 and for one month, was held at Kemna concentration camp, where he was tortured physically and psychologically.

Sources 
 Kurt Schnöring, "Oskar Hoffmann" in: Wuppertaler Biographien. 14. Folge, Wuppertal (Born) 1984,

References

External links 
 

Members of the Landtag of North Rhine-Westphalia
German communists
Kemna concentration camp survivors
1953 deaths
1877 births
Social Democratic Party of Germany politicians